Jordan Juron (born June 5, 1994) is an American ice hockey forward. She most recently played in the National Women's Hockey League (NWHL; renamed PHF in 2021) with the Buffalo Beauts during the 2020–21 season.

Playing career 
As a youth player, Juron played with the Troy Albany Youth Hockey boys teams, before switching to the girls' team at Middlesex School, a private secondary school in Concord, Massachusetts. 

Across four years with the Boston University Terriers women's ice hockey program, Juron recorded 15 goals and 25 assists for 40 points in 141 games and won the Hockey East conference three times.

After graduating, Juron took a year away from ice hockey before signing her first professional contract with the Buffalo Beauts in the NWHL. She scored 2 points in her first two games with the Beauts, before the team lost in the Isobel Cup semi-finals. At the beginning of the 2018–19 season, she suffered a spine injury that forced her to miss most of the year.

In May 2019, Juron joined the Professional Women's Hockey Players Association (PWHPA) after the collapse of the Canadian Women's Hockey League (CWHL), along with most of the Beauts' roster. She would spend most of the season with the organisation before returning to the NWHL in January 2020 with the Boston Pride. She was the first PWHPA affiliated player to re-join the NWHL. She put up 3 points in 8 regular season games with Boston, as well as scoring a goal in the semi-finals before the playoffs were indefinitely postponed due to the 2019–20 coronavirus outbreak.

She left Boston to return to the Beauts for the 2020–21 NWHL season and was named an alternate captain for the team.

Career statistics

Source:

References

External links
 

1994 births
Living people
American women's ice hockey forwards
Boston Pride players
Boston University alumni
Boston University Terriers women's ice hockey players
Buffalo Beauts players
Ice hockey players from New York (state)
Middlesex School alumni
People from Latham, New York
Professional Women's Hockey Players Association players
21st-century American women